Pilgrim is an unincorporated community and census-designated place (CDP) in Benzie County in the U.S. state of Michigan. At the 2010 census, the CDP had a permanent population of 11.  Pilgrim is located within Crystal Lake Township.

Geography
Pilgrim is located in Crystal Lake Township in western Benzie County.  It is situated between Lake Michigan to the west and Crystal Lake to the east. M-22 (Pilgrim Highway) runs through the center of the community, leading south  to the city of Frankfort. The Betsie Dunes Nature Preserve is immediately to the north.  As an unincorporated community, Pilgrim is administered by Crystal Lake Township and uses the Frankfort 49635 ZIP Code.

History
The community of Pilgrim was listed as a newly-organized census-designated place for the 2010 census, meaning it now has officially defined boundaries and population statistics for the first time.  With a permanent population of 11, Pilgrim is the least-populated of the 159 census-designated places in Michigan.

Demographics

References

Traverse City micropolitan area
Census-designated places in Michigan
Unincorporated communities in Benzie County, Michigan
Unincorporated communities in Michigan
Census-designated places in Benzie County, Michigan
Michigan populated places on Lake Michigan